Fehl is a surname. Notable people with the surname include:

Fred Fehl (1906–1995), American photographer
Philipp Fehl (1920–2000), Austrian artist and historian
Raina Fehl (1920–2009), Austrian-born American writer, historian, and editor

See also
Fell (surname)